The Prout School is a private, coeducational, college-preparatory high school located in Wakefield, Rhode Island. It is a member of the New England Association of Schools and Colleges (NEASC) and is an International Baccalaureate school. It is the only International Baccalaureate high school in Rhode Island. It services all of New England, but more specifically Rhode Island and Connecticut.

History 

Located in the Roman Catholic Diocese of Providence, The Prout School was founded in 1966 by the Sisters of the Cross and Passion of Manchester, England and named after Mother Mary Joseph Prout, the order's founder. The school was originally an all female institution called Prout Memorial High School. The campus was built on a  property adjacent to nearby Wakefield (South Kingstown). In 1981, the school became a diocesan high school, and in 1986 it became a co-educational institution and was renamed The Prout School. In 1992, following the 25th anniversary of the school, Prout became the third United States school to become a member of the International Baccalaureate Organization.

Extracurricular activities 

Prout has a very large active arts program, including theatre, music, visual arts, and dance. The theatre department puts on a play in the winter and a musical in the fall and spring. The dance, music, and visual arts departments have a joint program every December and June.

In addition to the arts programs, the school also offers many clubs and non-athletic teams including Mock Trial, Robotics, and Math Team. The school's chapter of the Rhode Island Model Legislature has been highly successful in recent years.  In the 2020–2021 school year (the Seventy-Fourth Rhode Island Model Legislature), the club enjoyed its most successful year, with Michael J. Garman, the leader of the Liberal Party, serving as President of the State Senate and Ruth Axford as State Senate Conservative Party Leader.

Notable alumni
Carolyn Rafaelian, founder of Alex and Ani
Mason Feole, professional baseball player (2019–present)

See also

Catholic schools in the United States
Higher education
List of Rhode Island schools
Parochial school

Notes and references

External links 
 The Prout School homepage

Catholic secondary schools in Rhode Island
International Baccalaureate schools in Rhode Island
Educational institutions established in 1966
Schools in Washington County, Rhode Island
Buildings and structures in South Kingstown, Rhode Island
1966 establishments in Rhode Island
Roman Catholic Diocese of Providence